Siphonogamy is a condition in plants in which pollen tubes are developed for the transfer of the male cells to the eggs. The seed plants are siphonogamous, while in the lower plants the male cells usually swim to the eggs. As a consequence, the spermatophytes were sometimes called siphonogams.

References
 

Plant reproduction